Sean Lazzerini (born 13 July 1997) is a British amateur boxer who is affiliated with Bellahouston ABC. He represented Scotland at the 2018 Commonwealth Games.He competed in the 2022 Commonwealth Games, and won a gold medal.

In August 2019, Lazzerini was selected to compete at the World Championships in Yekaterinburg, Russia.

References

1997 births
Living people
British male boxers
Boxers at the 2018 Commonwealth Games
Commonwealth Games competitors for Scotland
Light-heavyweight boxers
Boxers at the 2022 Commonwealth Games
Commonwealth Games gold medallists for Scotland
Commonwealth Games medallists in boxing
21st-century Scottish people
Medallists at the 2022 Commonwealth Games